Richard Purcell may refer to:

Richard Purcell (architect), Irish architect and builder
Richard Purcell (MP) (died 1586), English politician
Rick Purcell (born 1959), American politician from Massachusetts
Dick Purcell (1908–1944), American actor